Cortinarius moserianus is an agaric fungus of the genus Cortinarius found in Europe. It was described as new to science in 1970 by the Hungarian mycologist Gábor Bohus, from collections made in Hungary.

See also
List of Cortinarius species

References

External links

moserianus
Fungi described in 1970
Fungi of Europe